Ivan Krapić (born 14 February 1989) is a Croatian water polo player. He represented his country at the 2016 Summer Olympics.

Orders
Order of Danica Hrvatska with face of Franjo Bučar - 2016

See also
 List of Olympic medalists in water polo (men)
 List of world champions in men's water polo
 List of World Aquatics Championships medalists in water polo

References

External links
 

1989 births
Living people
Sportspeople from Rijeka
Croatian male water polo players
Water polo centre forwards
Water polo players at the 2016 Summer Olympics
Medalists at the 2016 Summer Olympics
Olympic silver medalists for Croatia in water polo
Competitors at the 2013 Mediterranean Games
Mediterranean Games medalists in water polo
Mediterranean Games gold medalists for Croatia
21st-century Croatian people